The Route de France was a multi-day road cycling race held in France between 1951 and 1990. The race was considered an amateur version of the Tour de France and competed with the Tour de l'Avenir after its creation in 1961. Its route traveled through Auvergne, around Vichy, and climbed in particular the Puy de Dôme.

Winners

References

Cycle races in France
1951 establishments in France
Recurring sporting events established in 1951
1990 disestablishments in France
Recurring sporting events disestablished in 1990
Defunct cycling races in France